Agathistoma lividomaculatum, common name the West Indian tegula, is a species of sea snail, a marine gastropod mollusk in the family Tegulidae.

Description
The size of the shell varies between 10 mm and 22 mm. The imperforate shell has a broadly ovate-conical shape. The color of the shell is a pale gray to brownish-white with small mottlings of dark brown or reddish brown. This mottling often occurs in axial streaks. The top of the rounded whorls show numerous, small spiral cords, with the largest cord on the angular periphery. The sutures are narrow. The base of the shell is slightly rounded. The aperture is almost round and has a curved lip. The inside of the lip is sulcate. The spiral platform descends into the deep and round umbilicus. It shows on its sides furrows of two spiral cords. The columella is set back far at its upper half and has several beads at its base.

Distribution
This species occurs abundantly under rocks at low tide in the Caribbean Sea, the Gulf of Mexico but rather uncommon in the Florida Keys; and off the Lesser Antilles at depths between 0 m and 2 m.

References

 d'Orbigny, A. 1842. Mollusques. Histoire Physique, Politique et Naturelle de l'île de Cuba 2: 1-112, pls. 10-21?. Arthus Bertrand: Paris.
 Philippi, R. A. 1844. Trochus. Abbildungen und Beschreibungen neuer oder wenig gekannter Conchylien 1(6): 137–141, pl. 4
 Philippi, R. A. 1849. Centuria altera testaceorum novorum. Zeitschrift für Malakozoologie 5: 99-112
 Rosenberg, G., F. Moretzsohn, and E. F. García. 2009. Gastropoda (Mollusca) of the Gulf of Mexico, Pp. 579–699 in Felder, D.L. and D.K. Camp (eds.), Gulf of Mexico–Origins, Waters, and Biota. Biodiversity. Texas A&M Press, College Station, Texas.

External links
 
  Adams, C. B. (1845). Specierum novarum conchyliorum, in Jamaica repertorum, synopsis. Proceedings of the Boston Society of Natural History. 2: 1-17
 Philippi, R. A. (1842-1850). Abbildungen und Beschreibungen neuer oder wenig gekannter Conchylien unter Mithülfe mehrerer deutscher Conchyliologen. Cassel, T. Fischer: Vol. 1: 1-20
 Tenison Woods, J. E. (1877). On some new Tasmanian marine shells. (Second series). Papers and Proceedings and Report of the Royal Society of Tasmania. (1876): 131-159
 Dornellas, A. P.; Graboski, R. M.; Hellberg, M. E.; Lotufo, T. M. C. (2021). Phylogeography of Agathistoma (Turbinidae, Tegulinae) snails in tropical and southwestern Atlantic. Zoologica Scripta. DOI: 10.1111/zsc.12517

lividomaculatum
Gastropods described in 1845